The jinnalaluo (also called kimnaras, feiren, and yeishen) were divine creatures with human bodies and animal's heads that were featured in Buddhist mythology.

Description 
These beings resemble human bodies and have the heads of animals, most notably horses or birds.

Role in Chinese mythology 
They are celestial musicians, whose music is said to fill Heaven. They play a variety of instruments and are linked to a very ancient Indian art form, where they are portrayed as birds-of-paradise.

Sources 

Chinese legendary creatures
Buddhist legendary creatures